Willo, Arizona, commonly known as the Willo Historic District, is a community neighborhood within Phoenix, Arizona. The Willo Historic District is a suburb of downtown Phoenix. It has small shops, houses, and apartments. According to the 2013 census, it has a population of 2,198 people.

References

Geography of Arizona